Thorang Legislative Assembly constituency is one of the 40 Legislative Assembly constituencies of Mizoram state in India.

It is part of Lunglei district and is reserved for candidates belonging to the Scheduled tribes.

Member of the Legislative Assembly

Election results

2018

References

Lunglei district
Assembly constituencies of Mizoram